Carabus insulicola is a species of black-coloured beetle from family Carabidae, that is endemic to Japan. Some of the species can be of green or brown colour.

References

insulicola
Beetles described in 1869
Endemic fauna of Japan
Beetles of Asia